The results of the 2013 4th Tarang Cine Awards, the awards presented annually by the Tarang entertainment television channel to honor artistic and technical excellence in the Oriya language film industry of India ("Ollywood"), are as follow:
 Best Film : Something Something 
 Best Actor (Male) : Anubhav Mohanty-  Something Something
 Best Actor (Female) : Barsha Priyadarshini - Something Something
 Best Actor in Supporting Role (Male): Mihir Das - Shapath
 Best Actor in Supporting Role (Female) : Aparajita Mohanty -Thookul
 Best Actor in Comic Role :Harihara Mahapatra - Something Something
 Best Actor in Nagative Role (Male) : Samaresh Routray - Luchakali
 Best Actor in Nagative Role (Female) : Shweta Acharya - Luchakali & Thookul
 Best Editor : Chandra Sekhar Mishra - ACP Ranveer 
 Best Dialogues : Bijay Malla -Bad Girl
 Best Cinematographer – Abhiram Mishra - Luchakali
 Best Debutant : Prakruti Mishra
 Best Child Artist : Lohitakhya Pattnaik -- Idiot: I Do Ishq Only Tumse 
 Best Singer (Male) : Shaan 
 Best Singer (Female) : Sohini Mishra  
 Best Jodi : Babushan & Riya Dey - Idiot: I Do Ishq Only Tumse

References

2013 Indian film awards
Tarang Cine Awards